The 2007 Barbarians rugby union tour  was a series of matches played in May 2007 in by Barbarians F.C. They played for the first time against Belgium, then against England and Ireland

Results

Other matches in 2008 

During the year, the Barbarians, made other appearance against different teams

 The Mobbs Memorial Match

 150° anniversary of Edinburgh Academicals

 Remembrance match

 Olympic Centenary

2008 rugby union tours
2008
2007–08 in Belgian rugby union
2007–08 in English rugby union
2007–08 in Irish rugby union
2007–08 in Scottish rugby union
2008 in Australian rugby union